was a Japanese samurai who was an influential figure of the Bakumatsu period. His childhood name was Shizasaburo (鎮三郎).

Biography 
The son of Matsudaira Yoshitatsu of Takasu han, his brothers included the famous Matsudaira Katamori, Matsudaira Sadaaki, and Tokugawa Yoshikatsu. Together, the four men were known as the Takasu yon-kyōdai 高須四兄弟, or "Four Brothers of Takasu". First serving as daimyō of his native Takasu Domain, and then the Owari Domain, Mochiharu retired before succeeding to the headship of the Hitotsubashi branch of the Tokugawa house. An important figure in the Bakumatsu period, he eventually retired the Hitotsubashi headship in favor of his son Satomichi.

Family
 Father: Matsudaira Yoshitatsu (1800-1862)
 Mother: Norihime, daughter of Tokugawa Harutoshi
 Wife: Masahime, daughter of Niwa Nagatomi
 Children:
 Matsudaira Yoshimasa (1858-1860) by Masahime
 Tokugawa Satomichi by Masahime

References

Notes

Further reading
Hitotsubashi genealogy
Bolitho, Harold. The Collapse of the Tokugawa Bakufu, 1862–1868. Honolulu: University of Hawai'i Press, 1980.

|-

|-

1831 births
1884 deaths
Lords of Owari
Meiji Restoration
Owari Tokugawa family
Owarirenshi-Matsudaira clan